Lola Rodríguez Díaz (born 26 November 1998) is a Spanish actress, model, and LGBT rights activist.

Biography
At age eleven, Lola Rodríguez Díaz came out as transgender, and was recognized as such at school. With the support of her parents, she began her transitioning process at thirteen. She was a psychology student in Portugal when she began acting.

In 2015 she was the first transgender minor candidate for Queen of the Carnival of Las Palmas with the fantasy La vida es bella, sponsored by the Island Council. She followed in the footsteps of Isabel Torres, who had been the first trans woman candidate in 2005. Rodríguez was chosen fourth maid of honor. The same year, she participated in the Las Palmas LGBT pride demonstration, where she gave a speech.

In 2018, as part of the scheduled events of the Madrid LGBT pride parade, she wore a garment called the Amsterdam Rainbow Dress, made from the flags of countries where being a member of the LGBT community is illegal. In 2016 the dress was worn by Valentijn de Hingh.

Her first job in a television series was a starring role in Atresmedia's Veneno, created by Javier Ambrossi and Javier Calvo based on the life of Cristina La Veneno, where she played a young Valeria Vegas.

Filmography

Film

TV series

TV programs

References

External links
 
 

1998 births
Spanish LGBT rights activists
Living people
People from Las Palmas
Spanish female models
Spanish television actresses
Transgender actresses
Transgender female models
Spanish LGBT actors
Actresses from the Canary Islands